Percival Joseph Lewis (31 December 1928 – 3 October 2019), better known as Percy Lewis, was a Trinidad and Tobago-British amateur featherweight and professional feather/super feather/lightweight boxer of the 1950s and 60s.

Boxing career

Amateur career
As an amateur Lewis was runner-up for the 1950 Amateur Boxing Association of England (ABAE) featherweight title, against Peter Brander (Slough Centre ABC), boxing out of The Royal Air Force, was runner-up for the 1951 Amateur Boxing Association of England (ABAE) featherweight title, against Jim Travers (Lansdowne BC), boxing out of The Royal Air Force, won the 1952 Amateur Boxing Association of England (ABAE) featherweight title, against Steve Trainer (Hulme Lads ABC), boxing out of The Royal Air Force, represented Great Britain at featherweight in the Boxing at the 1952 Summer Olympics, losing to Georghe Ilie of Romania, and won the 1953 Amateur Boxing Association of England (ABAE) featherweight title, against Alan Sillett (The British Army), boxing out of Oxford YMCA ABC,

Professional career
He died in October 2019 at the age of 90.

References

External links

Image - Percy Lewis
Video - Amateurs Lay On Boxing Fireworks 1950
Video - A.B.A. Boxing 1952
Video - Services Boxing 1952
Video - Lewis Kos O'brien Aka Lewis K.O.'s O'brien 1959
Video - Accra Sees Big Fight 1962

Percy Lewis' profile at Sports Reference.com

1928 births
2019 deaths
Boxers at the 1952 Summer Olympics
British male boxers
Featherweight boxers
Lightweight boxers
Olympic boxers of Great Britain
Super-featherweight boxers
Trinidad and Tobago male boxers
Trinidad and Tobago emigrants to the United Kingdom
20th-century Royal Air Force personnel